CloudKitchens is a ghost kitchen and virtual restaurant company started by Diego Berdakin.

In a cloud kitchen, food is only prepared in a commercial kitchen for delivery or takeaway; there are no dine-in guests. With the help of cloud kitchens, restaurateurs can easily grow an already-existing business or launch a digital brand.

Funding 
In January 2019, Saudi Arabia's sovereign wealth fund, Public Investment Fund, invested $400 million in the startup's Series A round. By that time, Travis Kalanick had invested $300 million in the company; he sold $1.4 billion of his Uber stock by May 2019. Sources noted Kalanick's ties to Saudi Arabia, which includes Kalanick serving on an advisory board for Neom, Saudi Arabia's plan to build a futuristic "mega city" in the desert.

In 2018, Travis Kalanick purchased a controlling stake in City Storage Systems LLC, founded by Diego Berdakin, for $150 million, which operates as the parent company of CloudKitchens and is operated by Berdakin and Barak Diskin. This parent company arrangement allows CloudKitchens to operate as a shell company and to keep a level of secrecy or stealth to the startup.

In November 2021, CloudKitchens raised another $850million in a funding round valuing the company at $15billion. Investors included Microsoft, which previously backed Kalanick's Uber.

In 2022, the company was sued by three of its operators for allegedly violating labor laws and deceptive business practices. According to a report published by Business Insider, over 70% of CloudKitchens' operators left the company within a year. It was also alleged by partners that many facilities lacked property security and food safety measures.

Ghost kitchen operations
A ghost kitchen (or "dark kitchen") allows the kitchen space to operate as a commissary to others, which lets costs be shared and can exist in lower-overhead spaces than a standard restaurant.
Ghost kitchen partners include:
 Sweetgreen
 The Halal Guys
 Fat Sal's Deli
 Chick-fil-A
 Wendy's
 Burger King

Otter
CloudKitchens created Otter, a food order platform, which consolidates orders from various platforms (such as Uber Eats, Postmates, Caviar, DoorDash) for kitchens.

Internet Food Court
In April 2020, CloudKitchens launched—and closed—an experiment called the "Internet Food Court" in Koreatown, Los Angeles, with retro 8-bit. The Internet Food Court allowed families to order delivery from 100 virtual restaurants.

Future Foods
CloudKitchens' virtual restaurant division is named Future Foods. Virtual restaurant brands (or "pseudo-restaurants") are the opposite of a ghost kitchen: they allow existing restaurants to deliver food with the Future Foods brands. Future Foods handles marketing including food photography.

These Future Foods brand orders are organized for a restaurateur using the Otter order system.

CloudKitchens brands
 Excuse My French Toast
 Egg the F* Out
 B*tch Don't Grill My Cheese
 Charcootz
 LA Breakfast Club
 Send Noods
 Brooklyn Calzones
 Cupid's Wings
 Cheeky's Cheesesteaks
 Groovy Island Pizza
 Pimp My Pasta
 OMG BBBQLOL
 F*cking Good Pizza
 Hummus Hero
 Beverly Hills Platters
 Bob's Kabobs
 Fabulous Falafel
 Pastrami & Pickles
 Big Hotdog Energy
 Burger Mansion
 Killer Wings
 Devil's Soul Food
 Phuket I'm Vegan

Acquisitions and lobbying 
It acquired FoodStars BH Ltd, which opened in 2015.

Bradley Tusk provides political lobbying for the company.

References

External links
 

Online food ordering